, also known as , was a prominent Japanese bacteriologist who in 1911 discovered the agent of syphilis as the cause of progressive paralytic disease.

Early life
Noguchi Hideyo, whose childhood name was Seisaku Noguchi, was born to a family of farmers for generations in Inawashiro, Fukushima prefecture in 1876. When he was one and a half years old, he fell into a fireplace and suffered a burn injury on his left hand. There was no doctor in the small village, but one of the men examined the boy. "The fingers of the left hand are mostly gone," he said, "and the left arm, the left foot, and the right hand are burned; I don't know how badly."

In 1883, Noguchi entered Mitsuwa elementary school. Thanks to generous contributions from his teacher Kobayashi and his friends, he was able to receive surgery on his badly burned hand. He recovered about 70% mobility and functionality in his left hand through the operation.

Noguchi decided to become a doctor to help those in need. He entered Saisei Gakusha, which later became Nippon Medical School. He passed the examinations to practice medicine when he was twenty years old in 1897. He showed signs of great talent and was supported in his studies by Dr. Morinosuke Chiwaki. In 1898, he changed his first name to Hideyo after reading a Tsubouchi Shōyō novel of college students whose character had the same name—Seisaku—as him. The character in the story was an intelligent medical student like Noguchi but became lazy and ruined his life.

Career
In 1900 Noguchi travelled on the America Maru to the United States, where he obtained a job as a research assistant with Dr. Simon Flexner at the University of Pennsylvania and later at the Rockefeller Institute of Medical Research. He thrived in this environment.  At this time his work concerned venomous snakes.  In part, his move was motivated by difficulties in obtaining a medical position in Japan, as prospective employers were concerned that his hand deformity would discourage potential patients. In a research setting, he did not have a handicap. He and his peers learned from their work and from each other. In this period, a fellow research assistant in Flexner's lab was Frenchman Alexis Carrel, who would go on to win a Nobel Prize in 1912.

Noguchi's work later attracted the Prize committee's scrutiny. In the 21st century, the Nobel Foundation archives were opened for public inspection and research. Historians found that Noguchi was nominated several times for the Nobel Prize in Physiology or Medicine: in 1913–1915, 1920, 1921 and 1924–1927. During the 1920s, his work was being increasingly criticized for inaccuracies. In 1921, he was elected as a member of the American Philosophical Society.

While working at the Rockefeller Institute of Medical Research in 1911, he was accused of inoculating orphan children with syphilis in the course of a clinical study. He was acquitted of any wrongdoing at the time but, since the late 20th century, his conduct of the study has come to be considered an early instance of unethical human experimentation. At the time, society had not developed a consensus about how to conduct human experimentation and feelings varied about the medical research community. Antivivisectionists linked their concerns for animals with concerns about humans. The American Society for the Prevention of Cruelty to Children was founded in the late 19th century after the American Society for the Prevention of Cruelty to Animals.

In 1913, Noguchi demonstrated the presence of Treponema pallidum (syphilitic spirochete) in the brain of a progressive paralysis patient, proving that the spirochete was the cause of the disease.  Dr. Noguchi's name is remembered in the binomial attached to another spirochete, Leptospira noguchii.

In 1918, Noguchi traveled extensively in Central America and South America working with the International Health Board to conduct research to develop a vaccine for yellow fever, and to research Oroya fever, poliomyelitis and trachoma. He believed that yellow fever was caused by spirochaete bacteria instead of a virus. He worked for much of the next ten years trying to prove this theory. His work on yellow fever was widely criticized as taking an inaccurate approach that was contradictory to contemporary research, and confusing yellow fever with other pathogens. In 1927-28 three different papers appeared in medical journals that discredited his theories. It turned out he had confused yellow fever with leptospirosis. The vaccine he developed against "yellow fever" was successfully used to treat the latter disease.

Human experimentation scandal
In 1911 and 1912 at the Rockefeller Institute in New York City, Noguchi was working to develop a syphilis skin test similar to the tuberculin skin test. The subjects were recruited from clinics and hospitals in New York. In the experiment, Noguchi injected an extract of syphilis, called luetin, under the subjects' upper arm skin. Skin reactions were studied, as they varied among healthy subjects and syphilis patients, based on the disease's stage and its treatment. Of the 571 subjects, 315 had syphilis. The remaining subjects were "controls;" they were orphans or hospital patients who did not have syphilis. The hospital patients were already being treated for various non-syphilitic diseases, such as malaria, leprosy, tuberculosis, and pneumonia. Finally, the controls were normal individuals, mostly children between the ages of 2 and 18 years. Critics at the time, mainly from the anti-vivisectionist movement, noted that Noguchi violated the rights of vulnerable orphans and hospital patients. There was concern on the part of anti-vivisectionists that the children would get syphilis from Noguchi's experiments.

It became a public scandal and the media discussed it. The editor of Life pointed out:
If the researcher had said to these patients: "Have I your permission to inject into your system a concoction more or less related to a hideous disease?"—the invalids might have declined.

In Noguchi's defense, Rockefeller Institute business manager Jerome D. Greene wrote a letter to the anti-vivisection society, which had protested the experiment. Greene pointed out that Noguchi had tested the extract on himself before administering it to subjects, and his fellow researchers had done the same, so it was impossible that the injections could cause syphilis. However, Noguchi himself was diagnosed with untreated syphilis in 1913, for which he refused treatment from Rockefeller Hospital. At the time, Greene's explanation was considered a demonstration of the importance of the studies and care the doctors were taking in research. In May 1912 the New York Society for the Prevention for Cruelty to Children asked the New York district attorney to press charges against Noguchi; he declined.

In the United States, it was not until the late 20th century that sufficient consensus developed about human experimentation to gain passage of laws to protect subjects. Along the way, more protocols were developed about informed consent and rights of patients/subjects.

Death
Following the death of British pathologist Adrian Stokes of yellow fever in September 1927, it became increasingly evident that yellow fever was caused by a virus, not by the bacillus Leptospira icteroides, as Noguchi believed.

Feeling his reputation was at stake, Noguchi hastened to Lagos to carry out additional research. However, he found the working conditions in Lagos did not suit him. At the invitation of Dr. William Alexander Young, the young director of the British Medical Research Institute, Accra, Gold Coast (modern-day Ghana), he moved to Accra and made this his base in 1927.

However, Noguchi proved a very difficult guest and by May 1928 Young regretted his invitation. Noguchi was secretive and volatile, working almost entirely at night to avoid contact with fellow researchers. The diaries of Oskar Klotz, another researcher with the Rockefeller Foundation, describe Noguchi's temper and behavior as erratic and bordering on the paranoid. His methods were haphazard.

According to Klotz, he inoculated huge numbers of monkeys with yellow fever, but failed to keep proper records. He may have believed himself immune to yellow fever, having been inoculated with a vaccine of his own development. Possibly his erratic and irresponsible behavior was caused by the untreated syphilis with which he was diagnosed in 1913, and which may have progressed to neurosyphilis.

Despite repeated promises to Young, Noguchi failed to keep infected mosquitoes in their specially designed secure housing. In May 1928, having failed to find evidence for his theories, Noguchi was set to return to New York, but was taken ill in Lagos.

He boarded his ship to sail home, but on 12 May was put ashore at Accra and taken to a hospital with yellow fever. After lingering for some days, he died on 21 May.

In a letter home, Young states, "He died suddenly noon Monday. I saw him Sunday afternoon – he smiled – and amongst other things, said, “Are you sure you are quite well?" "Quite." I said, and then he said "I don’t understand."

Seven days later, despite exhaustive sterilisation of the site and most particularly of Noguchi's laboratory, Young himself died of yellow fever.

Legacy

While Noguchi was influential during his lifetime, later research was not able to reproduce many of his claims, including having discovered the causes of polio, rabies, syphilis, trachoma, and yellow fever.  His finding that Noguchia granulosis causes trachoma was questioned within a year of his death, and overturned shortly thereafter. His identification of the rabies pathogen was wrong,  because the medium he invented to cultivate bacteria was seriously prone to contamination. A fellow Rockefeller Institute researcher said that Noguchi "knew nothing about the pathology of yellow fever" and criticized him for being unwilling to issue retractions for false claims, saying, "I don't think that Noguchi was an honest scientist". Noguchi's failures have often been attributed to his tendency to work in isolation without the skeptical eye of fellow researchers. What are considered flaws in the Rockefeller Institute's system of peer review is also a frequent subject of criticism.

Noguchi's most famous contribution is his identification of the causative agent of syphilis (the bacteria Treponema pallidum) in the brain tissues of patients with partial paralysis due to meningoencephalitis. Other lasting contributions include the use of snake venom in serums, the identification of the leishmaniasis pathogen and of Carrion's disease with Oroya fever. His claim to have grown a culture of syphilis is considered irreproducible.

Selected works
 1904:    The Action of Snake Venom Upon Cold-blooded Animals.
Washington, D.C.: Carnegie Institution. [OCLC 2377892]
 1909:    Snake Venoms: An Investigation of Venomous Snakes with Special Reference to the Phenomena of Their Venoms.
Washington, D.C.: Carnegie Institution. [OCLC 14796920]
 1911:   Serum Diagnosis of Syphilis and the Butyric Acid Test for Syphilis.
Philadelphia: J. B. Lippincott. [OCLC 3201239]
 1923:   Laboratory Diagnosis of Syphilis: A Manual for Students and Physicians.
New York: P. B. Hoeber.  [OCLC 14783533]

Honors during Noguchi's lifetime
Noguchi was honored with Japanese and foreign decorations. He received honorary degrees from a number of universities.

He was self-effacing in his public life, and he often referred to himself as "funny Noguchi." Those who knew him well said that he "gloated in honors." When Noguchi was awarded an honorary doctorate at Yale, William Lyon Phelps observed that the kings of Spain, Denmark and Sweden had conferred awards, but "perhaps he appreciates even more than royal honors the admiration and the gratitude of the people."
 Kyoto Imperial University, Doctor of Medicine, 1909.
 Knight of the Order of Dannebrog, 1913 (Denmark).
 Commander of the Order of Isabella the Catholic, 1913 (Spain).
 Commander of the Order of the Polar Star, 1914 (Sweden).
 Tokyo Imperial University, Doctor of Science, 1914.
 Order of the Rising Sun, Gold Rays with Rosette, 1915.
 Imperial Award, Imperial Academy (Japan), 1915.
 Central University of Ecuador, 1919, (Ecuador).
 National University of San Marcos, 1920, (Peru)
 Medicine School of Merida, "Doctor Honoris Causa en Medicina y Cirugía", 1920 (México)
 University of Guayaquil, 1919, Ecuador.
 Yale University, 1921, (United States).
 Knight of the Legion of Honour of France, 1924
 Senior fifth rank in the order of precedence, Japanese government, 1925

Posthumous honors

Noguchi's remains were returned to the United States and buried in Woodlawn Cemetery in the Bronx, New York City.

In 1928, the Japanese government awarded Noguchi the Order of the Rising Sun, Gold and Silver Star, which represents the second highest of eight classes associated with the award.

In 1979, the Noguchi Memorial Institute for Medical Research (NMIMR) was founded with funds donated by the Japanese government at the University of Ghana in Legon, a suburb north of Accra.

In 1981, the Instituto Nacional de Salud Mental (National Institute of Mental Health) "Honorio Delgado - Hideyo Noguchi" was founded with founds of the Peruvian Government and the JICA (Japan International Cooperation Agency) in Lima - Perú.

Dr. Noguchi's portrait has been printed on Japanese 1000-yen banknotes since 2004. In addition, the house near Inawashiro where he was born and brought up is preserved. It is operated as part of a museum to his life and achievements.

Noguchi's name is honored at the Centro de Investigaciones Regionales Dr. Hideyo Noguchi at the Universidad Autónoma de Yucatán.

A 2.1 km street in Guayaquil, Ecuador downtown is named after Dr. Hideyo Noguchi.

Hideyo Noguchi Africa Prize
The Japanese Government established the Hideyo Noguchi Africa Prize in July 2006 as a new international medical research and services award to mark the official visit by Prime Minister Jun'ichirō Koizumi to Africa in May 2006 and the 80th anniversary of Dr. Noguchi's death.  The Prize is awarded to individuals with outstanding achievements in combating various infectious diseases in Africa or in establishing innovative medical service systems.  The presentation ceremony and laureate lectures coincided with the Fourth Tokyo International Conference on African Development in late April 2008. In 2009, the conference venue was moved from Tokyo to Yokohama as another way of honoring the man after whom the prize was named. In 1899, Dr. Noguchi worked at the Yokohama Port Quarantine Office as an assistant quarantine doctor.

The Prize is expected to be awarded every five years. The prize has been made possible through a combination of government funding and private donations.

See also

 List of medicine awards
 Max Theiler - completed Noguchi's work, yellow fever vaccine (1926)
 Human experimentation in the United States
 Tōki Rakujitsu - Japanese film

Notes

References

 
 
 D'Amelio, Dan.  Taller Than Bandai Mountain: The Story of Hideyo Noguchi. New York: Viking Press.  (cloth) [OCLC 440466]
 
 Flexner, James Thomas. (1996).  Maverick's Progress. New York: Fordham University Press.   (cloth)
 
 
 Kita, Atsushi. (2005).  Dr. Noguchi's Journey: A Life of Medical Search and Discovery (tr., Peter Durfee). Tokyo: Kodansha.   (cloth)
 
 
 Lederer, Susan E. Subjected to Science: Human Experimentation in America before the Second World War, Johns Hopkins University Press, 1995/1997 paperback
 
 
 
 
 
 Sri Kantha, S. "Hideyo Noguchi's research on yellow fever (1918–1928) in the pre-electron microscopic era", Kitasato Archives of Experimental Medicine, April 1989; 62(1): 1–9.

External links

 Noguchi Memorial Institute for Medical Research, University of Ghana, Legon
 Japanese Government Internet TV:  streaming video, "Hideyo Noguchi Africa Prize," 2007/04/26 (5 mins.)
 Fukushima Prefecture: "The Dreamer, Hideyo Noguchi," slide show
 Cabinet Office, Government of Japan: Hideyo Noguchi Africa Prize
 Japan Society for the Promotion of Science (JSPS): Purpose and Description of the Noguchi Prize
 National Diet Library: NDL portrait
 Yomiuri Shimbun:  Noguchi -- slightly less than 90% name recognition amongst primary school students in Japan, 2008.

1876 births
1928 deaths
People from Fukushima Prefecture
Japanese expatriates in the United States
Japanese bacteriologists
Japanese microbiologists
Ghana–Japan relations
People of the Empire of Japan
Recipients of the Order of the Rising Sun, 2nd class
Recipients of the Legion of Honour
Laureates of the Imperial Prize
Knights of the Order of the Dannebrog
Knights Grand Cross of the Order of Isabella the Catholic
Order of the Polar Star
Deaths from yellow fever
Burials at Woodlawn Cemetery (Bronx, New York)